The Art of Sound is an exhibition which was developed in 2013 by the National Film and Sound Archive (NFSA) in collaboration with art galleries in Australia to explore the use of sound in the visual arts.

The curators at the NSFA compiled a sound palette, which comprises a wide variety of Australian audio recordings from the NFSA's sound collection. There are music, speeches, and sounds from the environment. The curators at partner art galleries search the sound palette to find audio material that would complement their individual artworks and combine them for unique audience experiences at each gallery.

The gallery partners in the project in 2013 were:
 the Grafton Regional Gallery in northern NSW 
 the Holmes à Court Gallery at Vasse Felix in Margaret River, WA

As a national institution, the NSFA uses exhibitions, film festivals and touring projects to provide access to its collection of audiovisual materials to the people in regional Australia. The Art of Sound was supported by the National Collecting Institutions Touring and Outreach Program (an Australian Government program which supports projects that make collections available to all Australians).

References

Art exhibitions in Australia
Audiovisual art